Polevansia is a genus of African plants in the grass family. The only known species is Polevansia rigida. native to Lesotho and to Cape Province.

References

Chloridoideae
Monotypic Poaceae genera
Flora of Southern Africa